Zemiansky Vrbovok is a village and municipality in the Krupina District of the Banská Bystrica Region of Slovakia.

In the 17th century it was the property of the Cseszneky family and according to some sources Erzsébet Cseszneky, benefactress of the Lutheran Church and mother of Mátyás Bél also was born in the village.

Sources

 Jozef Fraňo: A tudós Bél

Villages and municipalities in Krupina District